Clash of the Champions is an American series of professional wrestling television specials that were produced by World Championship Wrestling (WCW) and Jim Crockett Promotions (JCP) in conjunction with the National Wrestling Alliance (NWA). The specials were supercards comprising pay-per-view caliber matches, similar to the World Wrestling Federation's (WWF, now WWE) Saturday Night's Main Event series. The Clash of the Champions shows were famous for typically not airing commercials during matches even though many of these matches lasted 20 minutes or more.

The first Clash of the Champions was held on March 27, 1988, by JCP and was entitled NWA: Clash of the Champions. Subsequent events had different subtitles, for example, Clash of the Champions II: Miami Mayhem, up until Clash of the Champions XVI: Fall Brawl 1991, which was the last event with a subtitle. JCP was sold to Ted Turner and renamed WCW in 1988, and WCW continued to air the events until 1997. The rights to Clash of the Champions now belong to WWE, which acquired WCW in 2001. All 35 episodes are available for on-demand viewing on Peacock in the United States and the WWE Network elsewhere.

History
Throughout 1987 and 1988, a bitter event scheduling war broke out between rival wrestling promoters Vince McMahon and Jim Crockett, Jr. On Thanksgiving night 1987, McMahon's World Wrestling Federation (WWF) aired Survivor Series against Starrcade from Crockett and the National Wrestling Alliance, two pay-per-view (PPV) events on the same day. At that time, many cable companies could only offer one live PPV event at a time, and furthermore were presented with an edict from the WWF saying that any cable company that chose to carry Starrcade would be barred from carrying any future WWF events. Hence, the WWF PPV was cleared 10-1 over Starrcade.

Following this incident, McMahon was warned by the PPV industry not to schedule PPV events simultaneously with the NWA again. However, he was still not willing to fully cooperate with Crockett, and on January 24, 1988, another scheduling conflict took place between the WWF and NWA. The NWA presented the Bunkhouse Stampede on PPV, while on the same night, the WWF aired the first Royal Rumble for free on the USA Network.

In 1988, with the WWF's WrestleMania IV around the corner, Crockett decided to give McMahon a taste of his own medicine. He aired his own supercard, Clash of the Champions for free on TBS on March 27, 1988 - the same night as WrestleMania. The first Clash was of PPV caliber and made Sting a star after he wrestled NWA World Champion Ric Flair to a 45-minute draw. WCW would repeat the practice again the following year with a Clash coinciding with the WWF's WrestleMania V. Although the main event of NWA Champion Ricky Steamboat defeating Flair in a best of three falls match was widely considered the best wrestling match that took place among the two promotions on that day, ratings and attendance for the event fell well below expectations due to the event not being advertised and the practice of conflicting major events would cease until the Monday Night Wars began in 1995.

Clash events continued on a sporadic basis over the next nine years, quickly changing focus to become a free marketing vehicle for NWA/WCW PPV events, similar to the WWF's Saturday Night's Main Event. WCW aired the 35th and last Clash of the Champions on August 21, 1997. In 1997 the determination was made to discontinue air Clash of the Champions due to the start of Thunder.

WWE, the owner of the WCW properties since 2001, resurrected the name under the WWE Clash of Champions pay-per-view starting in 2016.

Following a 25-year hiatus, the variant of the Clash event was resurrected by All Elite Wrestling as the Battle of the Belts in 2022 and airs on TBS' sister channel, TNT on a quarterly basis.

Dates and venues

Results

National Wrestling Alliance (Jim Crockett Promotions)

Clash of the Champions I

Clash of the Champions (known sequentially as Clash of the Champions I) took place on March 27, 1988, at the Greensboro Coliseum in Greensboro, North Carolina. There were 6,000 people in attendance and the show drew a 5.6 rating on TBS. This was aired head-to-head with WWF WrestleMania IV. In a "College Rules" match, Mike Rotunda won with a cradle for the one-count pin 1:10 into the second round.
In a match for the United States Tag Team Championship, The Fantastics' Tommy Rogers originally pinned The Midnight Express's Bobby Eaton to win the titles but the decision was reversed because Rogers' partner, Bobby Fulton, had thrown referee Randy Anderson over the top rope before the pinfall was made. The Road Warriors and Dusty Rhodes defeated The Powers of Pain and Ivan Koloff when The Barbarian accidentally hit his partner, The Warlord, with a diving headbutt. Animal wore a goalie mask during the match to protect his injured face.

Lex Luger and Barry Windham defeated Arn Anderson and Tully Blanchard for the World Tag Team Championship, when interference by the champions' manager J. J. Dillon backfired; Dillon held a chair on the apron but Lex Luger whipped Arn Anderson into the chair.

In the main event, Sting challenged Ric Flair for the NWA World Heavyweight Championship. Flair's manager, J. J. Dillon was suspended in a cage above the ring. As no wrestler scored a decision before the time limit expired, the decision was left to the judges appointed for this occasion: wrestling official Gary Juster awarded the match to Sting, while Penthouse model Patty Mullen decided in favour of Flair. Wrestling official Sandy Scott ruled the match a draw. No decision was announced for the remaining two judges, actors Jason Hervey and Ken Osmond, resulting in the match being ruled a draw and Flair retaining the title.

Clash of the Champions II: Miami Mayhem

Clash of the Champions II took place on June 8, 1988, at the James L. Knight Center in Miami, Florida. There were 2,400 people in attendance and the show drew a 4.8 rating on TBS. Throughout the show, wrestlers were being interviewed as they arrived to the building, most notably, Lex Luger who was attacked by the Four Horsemen and was busted open after being slammed head first into the trunk of his limo. This was a big deal at the time as it was the first time Luger had bled while in the NWA. This would also be an important factor in the conclusion of Luger's match against Ric Flair at the 1988 Great American Bash PPV. Kevin Sullivan was locked in a cage at ringside during the third match but stole the key from the Garvins’ valet Precious. Steve Williams ran in after the match to save the Garvins from a 3 on 2 beat down. Al Perez was disqualified when Larry Zbyszko interfered in the match attacking Koloff. The referee is knocked out near the end of the main event prompting Ric Flair and Barry Windham to interfere, resulting in a double disqualification.

Clash of the Champions III: Fall Brawl

Clash of the Champions III took place on September 7, 1988, at the Albany Civic Center in Albany, Georgia. There were 3,700 people in attendance and the show drew a 5.4 rating on TBS. Fall Brawl would later become a regular PPV event for WCW. After the match Steve Williams ran to the ring to congratulate Brad Armstrong. Armstrong replaced Tim Horner, who left the company in August. Despite the match not being announced as a no-DQ match, Kevin Sullivan is not disqualified when Al Perez interferes in the match. Dusty Rhodes won the match by pinning Gary Hart and not the legal opponent Kevin Sullivan. The bout was originally scheduled as Rhodes and Dick Murdoch vs Al Perez and Ron Garvin.  Garvin left the company in August and the bout was changed. Ivan Koloff had manager Paul Jones and The Russian Assassin at ringside. After accidentally costing Koloff the match Paul Jones and the Russian Assassin attacked Koloff soon joined by a second masked Russian Assassin turning Koloff face. Barry Windham was disqualified after hitting Sting with a chair. The referee didn't actually see the chairshot but is informed of it by San Francisco 49er John Ayers who came to ringside.

National Wrestling Alliance (World Championship Wrestling)

Clash of the Champions IV: Season's Beatings

Clash of the Champions IV took place on December 7, 1988, at the UTC Arena in Chattanooga, Tennessee. This was the first Clash of the Champions following the sale of Jim Crockett Promotions to Turner Broadcasting and the subsequent company name change to World Championship Wrestling. There were 8,000 people in attendance and the show drew a 4.5 rating on TBS. This show set up Starrcade '88. It was on this show that TBS/WCW experimented with a top down camera angle, which did not catch on. This is comparable to the "refer-eye" camera from Halloween Havoc '91. This was the finals of the tournament to crown new United States Tag Team champions, the titles were vacated when the Midnight Express won the NWA World Tag Team titles in September. Ron Simmons and Eddie Gilbert had originally lost to the Sheepherders in the semi-finals but the decision was reversed when the Sheepherders signed with the World Wrestling Federation. Ivan Koloff pinned Paul Jones after hitting him with Jones’ own illegal object. Koloff had one arm tied behind his back during the entire match. The Russian Assassins attack Koloff after the match only for the Junkyard Dog to make the save. Dusty Rhodes was disqualified for hitting Road Warrior Animal with a chair. Both Hawk and Sting had already interfered in the match. The Road Warriors chose Genichiro Tenryu to be the 3rd champion on the December 10th edition of NWA World Championship Wrestling

Clash of the Champions V: St. Valentine's Massacre

Clash of the Champions V took place on February 15, 1989, at the Cleveland Convention Center in Cleveland, Ohio. There were 5,000 people in attendance and the show drew a 4.6 rating on TBS. This show was warm up show for the Chi-Town Rumble PPV only 5 days later. Steven Casey was billed as "undefeated" coming into this match. The masked Blackmailer was Jack Victory who did double duty on the night (he was also Russian Assassin #2) Mike Rotunda replaced Kevin Sullivan in the match, Sullivan and Williams originally won the US titles. The main event match was declared a double disqualification when Sting, Junkyard Dog and Michael Hayes stormed the ring. Sting, JYD and Hayes were originally slated to face the Road Warriors and Tenryu but were locked in by Kevin Sullivan before the match. A Ric Flair scheduled interview resulted in a Ricky Steamboat confrontation and an unscheduled in-ring, and out-of-ring, brawl, resulting in Flair losing all his clothes except his socks and trunks. The ring announcer for the night was former IWA and WWF Play-by-Play announcer Jack Reynolds. Ricky Steamboat and Ric Flair had an in-ring contract signing for their match at Chi-Town Rumble.

Clash of the Champions VI: Ragin' Cajun 

Clash of the Champions VI took place on April 2, 1989, at the Louisiana Superdome in New Orleans, Louisiana. There were 5,300 people in attendance and the show drew a 4.3 rating on TBS. This show was used to build the WrestleWar 1989 PPV on May 7. Clash VI was held on the same day as WrestleMania V and on free TV in an attempt to hurt the PPV rating.

The Samoan Swat Team defeated The Midnight Express when Fatu hit Bobby Eaton with Paul E. Dangerously's phone without the referee seeing it. This was the continuation of the Jim Cornette/Paul E. Dangerously feud that started when Dangerously brought the "Original Midnight Express" to WCW.

The Varsity Club (Mike Rotunda and Steve Williams) defeated The Road Warriors when Williams cradled Hawk for the pinfall. The match was marred by controversial officiating: referee Teddy Long refused to count a pinfall for the Road Warriors only moments before making a fast count on Williams pinning Hawk. Long was subsequently fired as a referee and became a manager.

NWA World Champion Ricky Steamboat was challenged by former champion Ric Flair in a two out of three falls match. The results of the falls were:
Flair pinned Steamboat after reversing an inside cradle in the first fall (19:33)
Steamboat forced Flair to submit with a double chickenwing in the second fall (34:54)
Steamboat pinned Flair after a failed double chickenwing attempt. Flair fell on top of Steamboat, both men's shoulders were down, but Steamboat got his left shoulder up before the three count in the third fall (55:49).

The replay would show that Flair's foot was under the bottom rope, allowing him to get one last rematch at WrestleWar 1989.

In non-televised dark matches, Sting made Rip Morgan submit to the Scorpion Deathlock and Lex Luger forced Jack Victory to submit with the Torture Rack. Both matches were later shown on NWA World Championship Wrestling.

Matches 4, 5, and 6 are edited out on the WWE Network showing.

Clash of the Champions VII: Guts and Glory

Clash of the Champions VII took place on June 14, 1989, at the Ritz-Epps Fitness Center in Fort Bragg, North Carolina. The show drew a 3.8 rating on TBS. This show was used to build the Great American Bash 1989 PPV on July 23. Jimmy Garvin replaced Terry Gordy who participated in the first round match; it was Garvin's debut as an official Freebird, although he had been an "undercover" Freebird since 1983. The Freebirds beat The Road Warriors in the first round while the Dynamic Dudes beat Jack Victory and Rip Morgan. Jack Victory once again appears at a Clash of Champions under a mask, having previously appeared as "Russian Assassin #2" and "The Blackmailer" when the bookers needed a generic heel. The Ding Dongs won after a flying kneedrop / flying elbow double team move The Ding Dongs were Jim Evans and Richard Sartain who only wrestled a handful of matches under this gimmick. Stan Lane pinned Samu after the Road Warriors ran in and attacked the Samoan Swat Team while the referee was knocked out. The Midnight Express beat Bob Orton, Jr. and Butch Reed in the first round while the Samoan Swat Team beat Ranger Ross and Ron Simmons. This match is one of the first the Steiner Brothers had together. Jim Cornette was attacked by Paul E. Dangerously early in the match and helped to the back by the Dynamic Dudes. Terry Funk is disqualified for hitting Ricky Steamboat with the microphone. Funk beat down on Steamboat after the match until Lex Luger made the save. After running Funk off Luger turns on Steamboat and attacks him as well.

Clash of the Champions VIII: Fall Brawl '89

Clash of the Champions VIII took place on September 12, 1989, at the Carolina Coliseum in Columbia, South Carolina. There were 2,600 fans in attendance and the show drew a 4.7 rating on TBS. This show was used to build the first ever Halloween Havoc PPV on October 28.

Tom Zenk made the Cuban Assassin pass out from the Sleeper hold. This was Tom Zenk's WCW Debut match.

Scott Steiner was tripped by either Missy Hyatt or Robin Green at ringside. It was later revealed to be Robin Green who would later go on to manage Doom in a feud with the Steiner Brothers. This was the Steiner Brothers’ first ever shot at a world tag-team title.

Dick Slater and The Great Muta were disqualified after Muta uses the Asian mist on Sting and Slater strikes Ric Flair with his cast. Slater was a substitute for an injured Terry Funk. After the match, Funk jumped Flair from behind and tried to suffocate Flair by putting a plastic bag over his head. The following week on Power Hour, Funk refused to apologize. After the match, Slater hit Sting in the leg with a branding iron. Brian Pillman ran out and performed Cardiopulmonary resuscitation on an unconscious Flair.

Clash of the Champions IX: New York Knockout

Clash of the Champions IX took place on November 15, 1989, at the Houston Field House in Troy, New York. There were 4,000 fans in attendance and the show drew a 4.9 rating on TBS.

This show mainly dealt with fallout from Halloween Havoc PPV and set up the Iron Man / Iron Team tournaments at Starrcade 1989.

The Road Warriors were disqualified when Hawk hit the referee. The Freebirds had actually lost the NWA World Tag Team Championship on November 1, but the match had not aired yet, so the Freebirds were introduced as the NWA World Tag Team champions. Eaton pinned Douglas after Jim Cornette hits Douglas with his tennis racket. Jim Cornette was in a neutral corner at the start of the match before deciding to side with the Midnight Express.

"The Super Destroyer" marked Jack Victory's 4th "Masked Mystery Man" appearance at a Clash ("Russian Assassin #2", "The Blackmailer" and "The Terrorist").

The Steiner Brothers had actually won the NWA World Tag Team Championship on November 1, but the match had not aired yet, so The Steiners were not announced as the champions. The Skyscrapers were disqualified when Doom ran in and attacked the Steiner Brothers. During the match Sid Vicious punctures a lung and is replaced by "Mean" Mark Callous soon after. Woman's bodyguard Nitron makes his debut during the post match brawl between the Steiners, the Skyscrapers, Doom and the Road Warriors.

Lex Luger pinned Brian Pillman after hitting him with a chair while the referee was down. Sting saved Pillman from further attacks by Luger.

Ric Flair forced Terry Funk to say "I Quit" on the microphone due to the pain of the Figure Four Leglock. Gary Hart attacked Funk after the match and was quickly joined by The Great Muta. Sting saved Flair from the attack only to be attacked by Lex Luger. This match received a 5-star rating from Dave Meltzer.

Clash of the Champions X: Texas Shootout

Clash of the Champions X took place on February 6, 1990, at the Memorial Coliseum in Corpus Christi, Texas. There were 3,000 fans in attendance and the show drew a 4.5 rating on TBS. This was the show that set up WrestleWar. Norman the Lunatic pinned Kevin Sullivan behind closed doors in the women's bathroom. The Skyscrapers were disqualified for bringing a chair into the ring. Doom was unmasked as Ron Simmons and Butch Reed. In the main event Arn Anderson pinned The Dragonmaster after a DDT. Sting was originally scheduled to be in the match but was kicked out of the Horsemen earlier in the night and replaced with Ole Anderson. During the match Sting ran to the ring and tried to climb into the cage. During the ensuing brawl Sting blew out his knee.

Clash of the Champions XI: Coastal Crush

Clash of the Champions XI took place on June 13, 1990, in Charleston, South Carolina. There were 4,100 fans in attendance at the McAlister Field House on the campus of The Citadel and the show drew a 4.1 rating on TBS. This was the buildup show for The Great American Bash. Bam Bam Bigelow was disqualified when he refused to break his chokehold on Tommy Rich by the 5-count. The Midnight Express were disqualified after Stan Lane grabbed the referee to break up a pin count. Ric Flair was disqualified when the Four Horsemen interfered in the match.

Clash of the Champions XII: Mountain Madness/Fall Brawl '90

Clash of the Champions XII took place on September 5, 1990, at the Asheville Civic Center in Asheville, North Carolina. There were 4,000 fans in attendance and the show drew a 5.0 rating on TBS. The Master Blasters debuted at this event, however, after approximately one week Iron was replaced by Blade. Ric Flair was disqualified due to interference by Stan Hansen. After their match, Sting attempted to unmask the Black Scorpion, tearing away his black mask only to reveal a red mask underneath. The Scorpion quickly escaped when the "real" Black Scorpion appeared on the entrance ramp. Although he was never truly unmasked, the Black Scorpion that Sting wrestled was Al Perez.

Clash of the Champions XIII: Thanksgiving Thunder

Clash of the Champions XIII took place on November 20, 1990, at the Jacksonville Memorial Coliseum in Jacksonville, Florida. There were 5,000 fans in attendance and the show drew a 4.2 rating on TBS. This Clash of the Champions set up for Starrcade '90: Collision Course. The first match was originally scheduled as a 6-man tag team match with Bobby Eaton on the Fabulous Freebirds' team and El Gigante on the Southern Boys team, but before the match El Gigante was "injured" by the Freebirds, and the match was therefore changed to a regular tag team match. Ric Flair and Butch Reed both won coin tosses to determine who would represent their respective teams, while their respective partners Arn Anderson and Ron Simmons remained at ringside. Since Flair won, Flair and Anderson earned a rematch against Doom for the NWA World Tag Team titles at Starrcade and Teddy Long had to be Flair's chauffeur for a day. Had Butch Reed won, Teddy Long would have gotten the Yacht and Limosine and there would have been no rematch at Starrcade.

World Championship Wrestling

Clash of the Champions XIV: Dixie Dynamite

Clash of the Champions XIV took place on January 30, 1991, at the Georgia Mountains Center in Gainesville, Georgia. There were 2,200 fans in attendance and the show drew a 3.9 rating on TBS. This was the first Clash of Champions event not to be produced by the NWA. Dusty Rhodes returned to WCW following a brief stint in the WWF as the new booker and as color commentator. It was originally set to be held at the CNN Center in Atlanta, but due to security reasons arising from the escalation of the Persian Gulf War, it was moved to the Georgia Mountains Center in Gainesville. Doom was disqualified due to Sting being tossed over the top rope by Butch Reed. Tom Zenk lost the WCW World Television Championship in a match taped on January 7, but the match had not yet aired, so Zenk was billed as champion.

The event was poorly received by fans. A fan poll in the February 18, 1991, issue of the Wrestling Observer Newsletter showed only 79 out of 394 responding fans gave the show a "thumbs up" vote, with 48 voting "thumbs in between" and 267 voting "thumbs down." Ric Flair and Scott Steiner received the most votes for the event's best match, with 54. El Cubano vs. Ranger Ross received the most votes for the worst match of the night, with 45.

Clash of the Champions XV: Knocksville USA

Clash of the Champions XV took place on June 12, 1991, at the Civic Auditorium in Knoxville, Tennessee. There were 5,000 fans in attendance and the show drew a 3.9 rating on TBS. Steve Armstrong pinned Jimmy Garvin, Tracy Smothers pinned Badstreet, and Tom Zenk pinned Michael Hayes simultaneously. Terrance Taylor was disqualified when Richard Morton interfered. In the Loser of the fall-leaves-WCW tag team match Pillman was pinned, thus the storyline was that he was forced to leave WCW.  Pillman would continue to wrestle in WCW under a mask as The Yellow Dog until October 1991.  Masahiro Chono replaced Kensuke Sasaki in the tag team match. During the match, Scott Steiner tore his bicep. After the match, The Hardliners (Dick Slater and Dick Murdoch) attacked both teams. The WCW World Tag Team Championship, which The Steiners also held, was not on the line in this event. Steve Austin won the WCW World Television Championship on June 3, but the match didn't air yet, so Austin was not the champion on this show. In the first fall, Bobby Eaton pinned Ric Flair, In the second fall, Eaton was counted out, In the third fall, Flair pinned Eaton to win the match. Eaton's WCW World Television Championship was not on the line, although he lost the title to Steve Austin on June 3, but the match hadn't aired yet, so he was still recognized as champion.  This was the last Clash of Champions till 1993 for Flair, as he was soon stripped of the WCW World Title by Jim Herd due to a contract dispute. This led to Flair departing for the WWF.

Clash of the Champions XVI: Fall Brawl

Clash of the Champions XVI took place on September 5, 1991, at the Augusta-Richmond County Civic Center in Augusta, Georgia. There were 2,800 fans in attendance and the show drew a 3.7 rating on TBS. The Patriots defeated the Fabulous Freebirds to win the WCW United States Tag Team Championship on August 12, but the match didn't air yet, so the Freebirds were announced as the champions. Furthermore, the titles were not on the line, making it a non-title match. Larry Zbyszko pinned Bill Kazmaier. The titles were vacated on July 18, 1991, when one half of the reigning WCW World Tag Team Champions The Steiner Brothers, Scott Steiner, was injured. Steiner and Kazmaier defeated The Ringlords and One Man Gang and The Executioner to advance to the finals, while The Enforcers defeated The Young Pistols and The Patriots to advance to the finals. Earlier in the evening, Kazmaier was performing "feats of strength" in the ring when Anderson and Zbyszko attacked and injured his ribs with a weight plate. They exploited this injury during the actual match to gain the victory and the Tag Team Titles.

Clash of the Champions XVII 

Clash of the Champions XVII took place on November 19, 1991, at the Savannah Civic Center in Savannah, Georgia. There were 6,922 fans in attendance and the show drew a 4.3 rating on TBS.Prior to this show, Sting had received "Mystery Boxes" which revealed Cactus Jack and Abdullah The Butcher. This Clash was to reveal who was actually sending the boxes to Sting. It turned out to be Lex Luger. A match involving Arachnaman and Richard Morton was scheduled for this show, but ended up not taking place. Thomas Rich's partner in the York Foundation, Terrence Taylor actually tripped Rich up, allowing Josh to pin Rich. Ricky Steamboat was a surprise replacement partner for Barry Windham

Clash of the Champions XVIII

Clash of the Champions XVIII took place on January 21, 1992, at the Kansas Expo Center in Topeka, Kansas. There were 5,500 fans in attendance and the show drew a 3.7 rating on TBS. This event was a set-up for SuperBrawl II and saw the WCW debut of Jesse Ventura. It was originally scheduled as Brian Pillman and The Patriots vs. Diamond Studd and The Young Pistols.

Clash of the Champions XIX

Clash of the Champions XIX took place on June 16, 1992, in Charleston, South Carolina, at the McAlister Field House of The Citadel. The event aired on TBS on June 22, 1992. There were 4,600 fans in attendance and the show drew a 2.8 rating on TBS. The popularity of this event, and the opening of the new 12,000-seat arena twelve miles to the north, led this to be the last Clash on-campus.  Further Charleston-based Clashes were held at the new arena. The storyline was that Miguel Pérez Jr. and Ricky Santana were assaulted backstage, although it was never shown. The rest of the tournament took place at The Great American Bash 1992.

Clash of the Champions XX: 20th Anniversary

Clash of the Champions XX was a major professional wrestling supercard produced by World Championship Wrestling (WCW) and broadcast live on TBS on September 2, 1992, from the Center Stage Theater in Atlanta. The event was not only the 20th time WCW held a "Clash of the Champions" show but also marked the 20th anniversary of professional wrestling being shown on TBS as Mid-Atlantic Wrestling in 1972. The show was held at the Center Stage Theater, the same location where most of WCW's regular TBS show WCW Saturday Night were taped at the time.  It was also the final wrestling TV appearance for Andre The Giant, who died four months later. Other wrestling legends, including "Bullet" Bob Armstrong and Thunderbolt Patterson, appeared at the event as well.

Clash of the Champions XXI

Clash of the Champions XXI took place on November 18, 1992, from Macon, Georgia, at the Macon Coliseum.

Brian Pillman pinned Brad Armstrong after attacking him pre-match while feigning injury. Scotty Flamingo knocked out Johnny B. Badd in the second round after hitting him with a glove Page and Vegas filled with water during the rest period. This was 2 Cold Scorpio's debut in WCW. Simmons' original partner Robbie Walker was injured. This was Paul E. Dangerously's last appearance on WCW television. The ringside judges were Ole Anderson, Larry Zbyszko, and Hiro Matsuda; Anderson and Matsuda voted for Sting while Zbyszko voted for Rude. Rude's WCW United States Heavyweight Championship was not on the line in the match. After their match Barry Windham berated Dustin Rhodes for not going finishing off an injured Ricky Steamboat during the match. Windham then turned on Rhodes and hit him with his new finisher, the Implant DDT. Windham then went backstage, attacking Steamboat and Shane Douglas with a steel chair while they were being interviewed by Jesse "The Body" Ventura.

Clash of the Champions XXII

Clash of the Champions XXII took place on January 13, 1993, in Milwaukee, Wisconsin, at The MECCA. This was the last Clash for announcer Jim Ross who shortly after this event left WCW and joined the WWF.

Originally, it was scheduled to be Sting, Dustin Rhodes, Ron Simmons, and Van Hammer against Big Van Vader, Barry Windham, The Barbarian, and Rick Rude; due to injuries, Hammer and Rude dropped out and Orndorff took Rude's place. Earlier on the show, Vader's team got rid of Barbarian, and Vader injured Simmons. Cactus Jack came in during the match, siding with Sting and Rhodes, thus turning face. Johnny B. Badd replaced Erik Watts, where the storyline was that he was suspended from WCW, due to an altercation with Arn Anderson. Tony Atlas replaced Hammer in the arm-wrestling contest.

Clash of the Champions XXIII

Clash of the Champions XXIII took place on June 16, 1993, in Norfolk, Virginia, from the Norfolk Scope.

Dick Slater replaced WCW World Television Champion Paul Orndorff, who was injured in a car accident. Earlier, Maxx Payne shot Johnny B. Badd in the face with his Baddblaster. Flair pinned Pillman (09:41), The Blonds were disqualified (11:06). Although they won two straight falls, Anderson and Flair did not win the titles because the interference by Barry Windham caused the Hollywood Blonds to get disqualified in the second fall, thus the titles could not change hands. A dark match saw Jim Neidhart defeat Shanghai Pierce.

Clash of the Champions XXIV

Clash of the Champions XXIV took place on August 18, 1993, in Daytona Beach, Florida, from the Ocean Center.

Lord Steven Regal replaced the injured Brian Pillman. On September 1, Anderson and Roma would be stripped of the NWA World Tag Team Championship, due to WCW withdrawing from the NWA. Bobby Eaton replaced Regal, who replaced Pillman in the earlier match. If Vader had been disqualified in the main event, he would have lost the title to Smith. Cactus Jack returned after the main event match, attacking Vader. The Shockmaster made his WCW debut in one of the most infamous moments in wrestling history.

Clash of the Champions XXV

Clash of the Champions XXV took place on November 10, 1993, in St. Petersburg, Florida, from the Bayfront Arena.

Ric Flair pinned Big Van Vader but the referee later reversed the decision to a disqualification victory for Flair as Vader had accidentally knocked down the referee. As a result, Vader retained the championship.

Clash of the Champions XXVI

Clash of the Champions XXVI took place on January 27, 1994, in Baton Rouge, Louisiana, from the Riverside Centroplex.

This event saw the debut of Bobby "The Brain" Heenan in WCW.

Clash of the Champions XXVII

Clash of the Champions XXVII took place on June 23, 1994, in Charleston, South Carolina, from the North Charleston Coliseum.

WCW World Heavyweight Championship Ric Flair won the WCW International World Heavyweight Championship, unifying it with his own title. After this the unified championship was represented by the Big Gold Belt.

Clash of the Champions XXVIII

Clash of the Champions XXVIII took place on August 24, 1994, in Cedar Rapids, Iowa, from the Five Seasons Center.

Early on the show, Hulk Hogan was attacked by a masked man (played by Arn Anderson, though in the storyline the assassin was eventually revealed as Brutus Beefcake). Steamboat suffered a career-ending back injury during his match. He would however make a brief in ring return for the WWE in 2009.

Clash of the Champions XXIX

Clash of the Champions XXIX took place on November 16, 1994, in Jacksonville, Florida, from the Jacksonville Memorial Coliseum.

Clash of the Champions XXX

Clash of the Champions XXX took place on January 25, 1995, in Paradise, Nevada, from Caesars Palace.

Clash of the Champions XXXI

Clash of the Champions XXXI took place August 6, 1995, in Daytona Beach, Florida, from the Ocean Center.

If Harlem Heat and Sister Sherri won, they get a WCW World Tag Team Championship match against Bunkhouse Buck and Dick Slater at Fall Brawl. After losing to Vader, Arn Anderson and Ric Flair teased an eventual breakup and set up their match at Fall Brawl.

Clash of the Champions XXXII

Clash of the Champions XXXII took place on January 23, 1996, in Paradise, Nevada, from Caesars Palace.

Lord Steven Regal injured his knee during the opening dark match against Chris Benoit. Benoit bled from the eye after receiving several headbutts. The show included the wedding of Col. Robert Parker and Sister Sherri, which was interrupted by Madusa, who was revealed to have been seeing Parker on the side. Brian Pillman, during his match with Eddie Guerrero, grabbed ringside commentator Bobby Heenan's jacket neck from behind, causing Heenan to yell "What the fuck are you doing?". Heenan later apologized for his outburst. Disco Inferno forfeited his match to perform at Parker & Sherri's wedding.  This was revealed by an Elvis Impersonator (Mike Winner) who Sullivan attacked. The Road Warriors returned at this event and challenged WCW Tag Team Champions Sting and Lex Luger, with Sting agreeing to a match despite Luger being reluctant. Miss Elizabeth, Debra McMichael, Linda Bollea, Woman, and several other women initially came to the ring with Hogan & Savage. It was reported that Ric Flair, who lost the WCW World Title to Savage one day prior, threatened to quit WCW unless the finish to the main event (Hogan pinning Flair with the legdrop) was changed.  At the event, Flair pinned Savage after use of a foreign object. Live reports claim 75% of the crowd left during the dark match that closed the show.

Clash of the Champions XXXIII

Clash of the Champions XXXIII took place on August 15, 1996, in Denver, Colorado, from the Denver Coliseum.

Ric Flair was the WCW United States Heavyweight Champion at the time, making the match champion vs. champion, but his title was not on the line.

Clash of the Champions XXXIV

Clash of the Champions XXXIV took place on January 21, 1997, in Milwaukee, Wisconsin, from the Wisconsin Center Arena. Chris Jericho replaced Juventud Guerrera, who no-showed, while La Parka replaced Psychosis, who was injured.

Clash of the Champions XXXV

Clash of the Champions XXXV took place on August 21, 1997, in Nashville, Tennessee, from the Nashville Municipal Auditorium.

The main event was originally announced as a standard tag match, but was changed to a match for Hall and Kevin Nash's tag team titles before it began, with Randy Savage subbing for Nash under the Freebird rule.

See also 
List of All Elite Wrestling pay-per-view events
List of ECW supercards and pay-per-view events
List of FMW supercards and pay-per-view events
List of Global Force Wrestling events and specials
List of Major League Wrestling events
List of National Wrestling Alliance pay-per-view events
List of NJPW pay-per-view events
List of NWA pay-per-view events
List of Ring of Honor pay-per-view events
List of Smokey Mountain Wrestling supercard events
List of WWA pay-per-view events
List of World Class Championship Wrestling Supercard events
List of WWE pay-per-view and WWE Network events
List of WWE Saturday Night Main Event shows
List of WWE Tribute to the Troops shows

References

External links 
 Clash of the Champions 1-20
 WCW Clash of the Champions History
 WCW Clash of the Champions Ratings History
 World Championship Wrestling FAQ – Has WWF and WCW ever had a pay per view on the same night?
 SLAM! Wrestling: End of an era on TBS – Crockett, Flair and 'The Clashes' by John F. Molinaro
 Clash Royale

1988 American television series debuts
1997 American television series endings
Jim Crockett Promotions shows
TBS (American TV channel) original programming
World Championship Wrestling shows